John Patrick Hopkins (October 29, 1858October 13, 1918) served as mayor of Chicago, Illinois (1893–1895) for the Democratic Party. John Patrick Hopkins was the first of nine Irish American Catholic mayors of Chicago.

Hopkins was a close friend and a political ally of Roger Charles Sullivan.

Early life
Hopkins was born October 29, 1858, in Buffalo, New York.

Career
Because his brothers and fathers died when Hopkins was still young, he became a provider for his family. His first job at a foundry as a boy.  He later worked in Buffalo's grain elevators.

In 1879, he moved to Chicago with his mothers and sisters.

He worked for some times at the Pullman works. From 1883 to 1885 he served as a paymaster for Pullman interests.

In 1888, he founded the Started the Arcade Trading Co. in 1888, which later became the Secord and Hopkins Co.

Hopkins forged a career in Democratic politics.

Mayoralty
Hopkins was elected the 1893 Chicago mayoral special election, which was held after the assassination of mayor Carter Harrison Sr.

At 35 years of age when he took office, Hopkins became the youngest mayor the city had ever had.

His tenure was marred by numerous scandals, criticisms, and shortcomings. This included incidents of political corruption in the city, such as the Ogden Gas Scandal, rampant public gambling that drew the ire of the Chicago Civic Federation, an indecisive response by Hopkins to the Pullman Strike that was assailed by Republican press outlets. Additionally, the misappropriation of significant amounts of campaign contributions by Hopkins had upset many in the Chicago Democratic party, including those who belonged to the party's former Harrison faction.

Hopkins did not seek reelection in the 1895 Chicago mayoral election

Post-mayoralty

Hopkins died of the Spanish flu on October 13, 1918, in Chicago. He is buried in Calvary Cemetery in Evanston, Illinois.

Personal life
Hopkins never married.

References

1858 births
1918 deaths
Deaths from Spanish flu
Politicians from Buffalo, New York
Mayors of Chicago
American Roman Catholics
American people of Irish descent
19th-century American politicians
Illinois Democrats
St. Joseph's Collegiate Institute alumni
Burials at Calvary Cemetery (Evanston, Illinois)